The 1889 college football season was the season of American football played among colleges and universities in the United States during the 1889–90 academic year. 

The 1889 Princeton Tigers football team, led by team captain Edgar Allan Poe, compiled a perfect 10–0 record and was recognized as the national champion by the Billingsley Report, Helms Athletic Foundation, Houlgate System, National Championship Foundation, and Parke H. Davis.

In the South,  defeated Furman in the first intercollegiate game played in the state of South Carolina. The game featured no uniforms, no positions, and the rules were formulated before the game. 

As the popularity of the program increased, new football programs were established in 1889 at Iowa, Syracuse, and Washington.

All eleven players selected by Caspar Whitney for the first All-America college football team came from the Big Three (Princeton, Yale, and Harvard). Four of the honorees have been inducted into the College Football Hall of Fame: fullback Knowlton Ames (Princeton), end Amos Alonzo Stagg (Yale), tackle Hector Cowan (Princeton), and guard Pudge Heffelfinger (Yale).

Conference and program changes
The Western Interstate University Football Association began its first season of play

Awards and honors

All-Americans

The consensus All-America team included:

Statistical leaders
Player scoring most points: Bum McClung, Yale, 176

Conference standings
The following is a potentially incomplete list of conference standings:

Independents

References